Malacca International Airport  (formerly known as Batu Berendam Airport) is an airport located in Batu Berendam, Malacca, Malaysia. The airport serves the state of Malacca, as well as northern Johor. The  terminal complex is equipped with international-standard amenities that can handle 1.5 million passengers annually. The airport's 2135m runway allows Boeing 737 and Airbus A320 operations.

History
The airport, which occupies  of land, was built in 1952.

The airport and particularly its control tower bears historical significance as it was the same tower which guided the plane of Tunku Abdul Rahman, the first Prime Minister of Malaysia, to land from London on 20 February 1956. It was in Malacca that Tunku announced the date for the independence of then Malaya from the United Kingdom. Considering the historical nature of this control tower, the Chief Minister of Malacca, Mohd Ali Rustam is attempting to save the tower, by either relocating it, or by changing plans to incorporate the tower.

Between 2008 and 2014, the airport was served by Sky Aviation which operated flights from Pekanbaru five times per week. Flights ceased in 2014 when Sky Aviation suspended all operations.

"The state government is also discussing with Firefly and AirAsia to serve various routes via the Malacca Airport".

Malaysia's hybrid airline, Malindo Air, launched four-weekly flights from the Malacca International Airport to Penang, Malaysia, and Pekanbaru, Indonesia, on 4 November 2014.

In 2016, Indonesia's hybrid airline, XpressAir launched four-weekly flights from the Malacca International Airport to Pekanbaru, Indonesia, on 29 April 2016. China Southern Airlines launched an inaugural charter flight from Malacca International Airport to Guangzhou, China, on 29 September 2016. By the end of 2016, China Southern Airlines stopped charter flights to Malacca.

The airport is also used as the base of the Malaysian Flying Academy (MFA), which has been operating out of the airport since 1987.

AirAsia group chief executive officer Tan Sri Tony Fernandes said he had discussed with Transport Minister Datuk Seri Liow Tiong Lai in Putrajaya on 29 June 2016 for the potential of turning the Malacca International Airport into a low-cost terminal. Fernandes said AirAsia wanted to use the Malacca airport but had been unable to convince MAHB to allow AirAsia to use the airport.

AirAsia marked the arrival of its inaugural flight from Penang to the historical state of Malacca on 1 July 2019.

New terminal
Construction of a new terminal started on 1 April 2006. The terminal complex was replaced by a new  terminal equipped with international-standard amenities. The control tower was replaced and complemented with advanced aeronautical devices. Both ends of the runway now contain facilities to guide night landing and better assure safety in bad weather conditions.

In May 2009, the new terminal was officially opened. The new terminal could handle 1.5 million passengers annually as opposed to the 30,000 of the old terminal. The airport was visited by the Prime Minister of Malaysia, Datuk Seri Najib Tun Razak in February 2010. In his visit, he officially renamed the airport Malacca International Airport.

Facilities
APR-Aerospace Engineering has built a hangar in Malacca International Airport which can accommodate Boeing 737 or Airbus A320 for Aircraft maintenance, repair and overhaul (MRO) services, Aircraft modification and retrofits, Aircraft technical handling and ground support services, Aircraft spare support and pooling, Technical training on aircraft maintenance, repair and overhaul and Structured On-the-Job Training for APR-ATC's TAME program. The hangar was completed in April 2016.

The major facilities that are found in this airport include taxi services, gift shops, cafe, duty-free outlets, conference rooms, multi-purpose meeting and event centre, wheelchair service, staff assistance and free WiFi internet access.

Malacca International Airport is one of the seven airports in Malaysia that provide e-Visa facilities for Chinese tourists from September 2016 onwards.

Expansion and developments
In August 2015, Prime Minister of Malaysia, Datuk Seri Najib Tun Razak announce that federal government is mulling a proposal to expand the Malacca International Airport, particularly in conjunction with the recent Cabinet endorsement of the southern state's "twin state" status with China's Guangdong city. Malacca International Airport will upgrade its runway, apron, aerobridge and taxiway.

In October 2016, Transport Minister Datuk Seri Liow Tiong Lai said Malacca International Airport in Batu Berendam here may be relocated to accommodate larger aircraft like the Boeing 777. 
Liow said a decision will be reached by end of 2016 whether to move the airport to another location or remain at its present site based on the recommendation from an aviation consultant.

On 30 January 2017, State Transport, Project Rehabilitation and International Trade Committee chairman Datuk Lim Ban Hong said the runway of MIA will be extended to 2,500m following the decision by the Federal Government to extend the runway in a bid to accommodate larger aircraft without the need for land acquisitions while the work is expected to be completed in a short span of time. Expansion of Malacca International Airport will be completed in 2019.

On 27 November 2017, Malacca CM Idris Haron said Malacca International Airport is expected to upgrade next year (2018) with upgrade cost of RM74million (Under RM ke-11). The runway will upgrade from 2135m to 2665m and will build the taxiway and expand the apron as well.

On 20 September 2018, Malacca CM Adly Zahari announced that Malaysia Airports Holdings Berhad (MAHB) will introduce  a five-year rebate on the passenger service charge (PSC) for flights from Malacca International Airport (LTAM). Aside from the rebates, Adly said airline companies operating from LTAM will also be exempted from paying landing charges for a year. According to MAHB, the incentive was introduced as part of the group's efforts in working with the state government and airlines to promote tourism in the country.

Airlines and destinations

Passenger

Traffic and statistics

See also

List of airlines of Malaysia
List of airports in Malaysia
Busiest airports in Malaysia

References

External links

List of International Airports in Malaysia as Recognized by Malaysia Airport Holdings Berhad

EZineer – A forum with regular updates on Expansion work progress
Batu Berendam Airport, Malacca at Malaysia Airports Holdings Berhad
 Melaka Air can fly only after it obtains mandatory licences
Sky Aviation Flight Schedule
Firefly Flight Schedule

1952 establishments in Malaya
Airports established in 1952
Airports in Malaysia
Central Melaka District
Transport in Malacca